The Victory of Faith is an oil on canvas painting by Irish artist Saint George Hare that was completed in 1891. It depicts two sleeping nude women, one shackled, likely Christian martyrs sentenced to death by beasts (see damnatio ad bestias). The Victory of Faith is one of several paintings by Hare showing shackled women, another notable example being The Gilded Cage. A contemporary article in The Homiletic Review called it an "impressive depiction of Christian faith and steadfastness" and described the two women to be in a "sisterly embrace", while a modern description by Kobena Mercer named the work as an example of an interracial lesbian couple, likening it to Les Amis by Jules Robert Auguste.

The Victory of Faith was exhibited at the Royal Academy Summer Exhibition of 1891 and at the World's Columbian Exposition in 1893. It is currently at the National Gallery of Victoria in Melbourne, having been donated to the gallery in 1905.

Notes

References

1891 paintings
Irish paintings
Nude art